"Rambling Girls/Because of You" is the third Japanese single from the South Korean girl group After School. It is a double A-side single consisting of two songs, an original song titled "Rambling Girls" and a Japanese re-recording of their 2009 hit "Because of You". The single was released on January 25, 2012. The single debuted at #6 on the Oricon Daily Chart and #7 on the Oricon Weekly Chart.

Track listing

Chart performance

Oricon Chart

Release history

References

2012 songs
After School (band) songs
Hybe Corporation singles